The Coates Creek Schoolhouse is a historic one-room log schoolhouse in rural Mesa County, Colorado, on a county road known as DS Road, about  west of the hamlet of Glade Park, Colorado.  It was listed on the National Register of Historic Places in 1993.

It is a log structure built in 1919 by local homesteader Elwood Brouse.  It was used as a school from 1919 to 1971 and was used for church services and Sunday school until 1985.

It was expanded somewhat when rebuilt but was still one room. In 1942 it was expanded by the addition of a cloakroom and the interior was lined with plywood.

References

One-room schoolhouses in Colorado
Schools in Colorado
Log buildings and structures on the National Register of Historic Places in Colorado
National Register of Historic Places in Mesa County, Colorado
School buildings completed in 1919
School buildings on the National Register of Historic Places in Colorado